Coorooman is a rural locality in the Livingstone Shire, Queensland, Australia.

History 
The locality was named after its former railway station on the Emu Park branch line, which in turn took its name from the creek, which is believed to be an Aboriginal word coorawan meaning kangaroo.

Geography
The many branches of Cawarral Creek permeate the locality, forming much of the southern boundary, part of the eastern, and draining the interior.

Road infrastructure
The Rockhampton–Emu Park Road runs through from south to north.

References 

Shire of Livingstone
Localities in Queensland